Ľuboš Kolár (born 1 September 1989) is a retired Slovak football midfielder.

Club career
In February 2019, Kolár joined Austrian club SV 7023 ZSP. He retired at the end of the season.

References

External links
FC Nitra profile 

1989 births
Living people
Slovak footballers
Slovak expatriate footballers
Association football midfielders
FC Nitra players
FC Slovan Liberec players
Spartak Myjava players
Podbeskidzie Bielsko-Biała players
Slovak Super Liga players
Czech First League players
I liga players
Sportspeople from Nitra
Slovak expatriate sportspeople in Poland
Slovak expatriate sportspeople in the Czech Republic
Slovak expatriate sportspeople in Austria
Expatriate footballers in Poland
Expatriate footballers in the Czech Republic
Expatriate footballers in Austria